The Corpus Christi Rage was a professional indoor football team and a charter member of the National Arena League (NAL) that began play in its inaugural 2017 season.  Based in Corpus Christi, Texas, the Rage played their home games at the American Bank Center.

The Rage were the third arena/indoor football team to call Corpus Christi home, following the Corpus Christi Hammerheads/Fury, which played in eight different leagues from 2004 until 2016, and the Corpus Christi Sharks, which played in the af2 from 2007 until 2009.

History
On October 17, 2016, the Rage announced they had joined the new Arena Developmental League (which then became the National Arena League) in an introductory press conference, with their logo and color scheme unveiled that day.  The Rage were owned by Corpus Christi-area businessman Eric Dee Smith, who is an Army veteran and a former corrections officer, with Leonard Harris serving as the team's general manager.  The ADL officially confirmed the Rage's membership on October 28.

After the team's fourth game of their inaugural 2017 season, the Rage's operations were apparently taken over by the league from owner Eric Smith. Afterwards, the Rage had two home games cancelled during the season by the league: the first being the May 20 game against the Georgia Firebirds, which was cancelled as a cost-cutting measure as the league had also taken control of the Firebirds franchise the week before, and their final June 16 game against the High Country Grizzlies as both teams had already been eliminated from playoff contention. Neither game was considered a forfeit; they were simply erased from the league schedules as a no contest. The Rage folded during the last week of the season.

Statistics and records

Season-by-season results

Head coach

2017 roster

Coaching staff

2017 season

Schedule
Key: 

All start times are local time

References

External links
Corpus Christi Rage official website

 
2016 establishments in Texas
2017 disestablishments in Texas